Gamma Persei (Gamma Per, γ Persei, γ Per) is a binary star system in the constellation Perseus. The combined apparent visual magnitude of the pair is +2.9, making it the fourth-brightest member of the constellation. About 4° to the north of Gamma Persei is the radiance point for the annual Perseid meteor shower.

This is a wide eclipsing binary system with an orbital period of 5,329.8 days (14.6 years). This eclipse was first observed in 1990 and lasted for two weeks. During an eclipse, the primary passes in front of the secondary, causing the magnitude of the system to decrease by 0.55. The primary component of this system is a giant star with a stellar classification of G9 III. It has a projected rotational velocity of 50.0 km s−1 and a lengthy estimated rotation period of 14.6 years. The classification of the secondary remains tentative, with assignments of A3 V and A2(III).

Mass estimates for the two stars remain disparate. He noted that the mass estimate was too high for the given classification of the primary. They admit that the high inclination of the orbit resulted in a large margin of error. Ling et al.

Name and etymology
This star, together with δ Per, ψ Per, σ Per, α Per and η Per, has been called the Segment of Perseus.

References

Persei, Gamma
Perseus (constellation)
Persei, 23
014328
Eclipsing binaries
G-type giants
A-type main-sequence stars
0915
018925
Durchmusterung objects